Cats is a 1925 silent-era British comedy film directed by Leslie S. Hiscott and featuring Sydney Fairbrother, Frank Stanmore and Irene Tripod.

Cast
Sydney Fairbrother as Mrs. May
Irene Tripod as Mrs. McMull
Frank Stanmore	
Annie Esmond		
Edward O'Neill 
James Reardon	
Percy Parsons

References

External links
 

1925 films
British silent short films
Films directed by Leslie S. Hiscott
1925 comedy films
British comedy films
British black-and-white films
1920s British films
Silent comedy films